Edward Ingram (born February 11, 1999) is an American football guard for the Minnesota Vikings of the National Football League (NFL). He played college football at LSU.

Early life
Ingram attended DeSoto High School in DeSoto, Texas

College career
Ingram played guard for the LSU Tigers.

Professional career

Ingram was drafted by the Minnesota Vikings with the 59th pick in the second round of the 2022 NFL Draft.

Personal life
In August 2018, Ingram was arrested on two counts of aggravated sexual assault of a minor, stemming from events that occurred 2015. After charges were dismissed in September 2019, Ingram was reinstated to the team from his indefinite suspension.

References

External links
 Minnesota Vikings bio
 LSU Tigers bio

1999 births
Living people
American football offensive guards
LSU Tigers football players
Minnesota Vikings players